Oh My Venus is a South Korean television series starring So Ji-sub and Shin Min-a. It aired on KBS2 on Mondays and Tuesdays at 21:55 (KST) time slot for 16 episodes beginning on November 16, 2015.

Plot
Kim Young-ho, a.k.a. John Kim, is a personal trainer to Hollywood stars. Despite his family's wealth, Young-ho suffered a devastating illness in his childhood. But he believes living a healthy lifestyle and exercise is the only way to survive. He uses this to run from his family issues.  His fear of his father and pity for his grandmother. A Hollywood scandal with an actress has him on the run back to Korea.

Kang Joo-eun was once an ulzzang in her teens, semi-famous for her pretty face and enviable figure. Now a 33-year-old lawyer, she has gained a lot of weight since. She passes out on a flight from the U.S. back to Korea and John Kim is the only medical personnel on the flight who takes charge.  He watches out for her even after they arrive home.  After getting dumped by her boyfriend, Im Woo-shik, she finds that she has the press pass for John Kim and proceeds to (blackmail) convince him to help her lose the weight.

She discovers that Young-ho has a weakness for being a knight in shining armor. She moves in with him, Ji-woong and Joon-sung (Korean Snake), after a stalking incident and also her brother needing money for marriage anyway caused her to sell her apartment. As they work on her physical transformation, both discover they feel more for each other than what they will admit. As they grow closer they heal each other's emotional wounds and eventually falling in love before a tragedy befalls Kim Young-ho leaving his fate uncertain.

In a flashback scene, it's revealed that Kang Joo-eun met Kim Young-ho when he was dealing with bone cancer when he was a child and placed a plaster on his cast.

Cast
 So Ji-sub as Kim Young-ho/John Kim
Young-ho is a personal trainer of Hollywood stars in America where he uses the alias John Kim. After a Hollywood scandal with a famous actress puts the spotlight on him, Young-ho returns to Korea to wait for the scandal to die down. On the plane back to Korea, Young-ho saves Kang Joo-eun after she suddenly collapses. A series of events bring the two together on several occasions with Young-ho saving Joo-eun from pitiful situations several times. Things become further complicated when he is prevented from returning to America by his grandmother, the CEO of his family's company, who hopes Young-ho will one day become her successor. Despite his personal and family issues, Young-ho has a kind heart and tries to help others.

 Shin Min-a as Kang Joo-eun
Kang Joo-eun is a 33 year-old lawyer and formerly called the "Venus of Daegu" in her hometown. After finishing high school and fulfilling her dream of becoming a lawyer, Joo-eun gains weight and feels she is no longer beautiful. After being dumped by her long term boyfriend on their 15-year anniversary, Joo-eun takes an overseas trip to America for work. On the ride back to Korea she faints after too much alcohol, medication and a corset puts her into respiratory distress. Young-ho saves her and they meet several more times, often with Joo-eun in an embarrassing situation. After finding out the identity of Young-ho as John Kim, she asks him to help her lose weight in return for not telling anybody about his dual identity. She is a blunt and hard-working person.

 Jung Gyu-woon as Im Woo-shik
Im Woo-shik is a former national swimmer. After meeting her while she was still in high school, Woo-shik falls in love with Joo-eun and she becomes his long-time girlfriend. Despite claiming she is his first love, Woo-shik begins to lose interest in Joo-eun and secretly goes out with Oh Soo-jin, Joo-eun's former best friend. Eventually Woo-shik officially breaks up with Joo-eun. Despite the change in their relationship, he continues to worry about Joo-eun and keeps watch over her. He is curious about the relationship between Kim Young-ho and Joo-eun.

 Yoo In-young as Oh Soo-jin
As an overweight girl in school, Soo-jin was very self-conscious and was lonely until Joo-eun befriended her. Now a successful lawyer, Soo-jin has shed the weight and has the body of a super model. She takes a job at the same company as Joo-eun as her superior and dates Woo-shik to exact revenge on Joo-eun, who she had always been jealous of because of her good looks.

 Sung Hoon as Jang Joon-sung
He is a professional MMA fighter trained by John Kim, his alias is "Korean Snake". He used to be an orphan but John Kim gladly took him as his student and trained him to become a successful MMA fighter.

 Henry Lau as Kim Ji-woong
Ji-woong is naturally the mood-maker, a goofy and nice person. He works as Joon-sung's manager.

 Jung Hye-sung as Jang Yi-jin
Jang Yi-jin is a CF Queen of South Korea, also a girl with full of aegyeo (mean "acting cute" in Korea). After she confesses to Joon-sung saying that she is a big fan of him, she always follows him around and is obsessed with him. Despite her career in the entertainment industry, she is a daughter of rich CEO.

 Jin Kyung as Choi Hye-ran
Hye-ran is the second wife of Young-ho's father, Kim Sung-chul, who married him after Young-ho's mother died. Hye-ran has a son and wants him to get attention from Young-ho's family but he is not treated as an equal because he has no blood relation to them (Young-ho's father is the son-in-law of Young-ho's grandmother thus he is not a Gahong bloodline).

 Jo Eun-ji as Lee Hyun-woo
Hyun-woo is Joo-eun's friend and a single-mother. She works as a chef in a restaurant and is a loyal friend to Joo-eun. She has a strong bond with Joo-eun and they act almost like sisters. She is also close to Joo-eun's younger brother.

 Choi Jin-ho as Min Byung-wook
Byung-wook is a trust-worthy secretary for Young-ho's family and also a private secretary, he is a person whom Young-ho can depend on and trust. He is also concerned about Young-ho and helps him out.

 Lee Seung-ho as Kim Yeong-joon
 Go Geon-han as Mr. Byeong

Production
Shin underwent heavy make-up and costuming for her role as the overweight Kang Joo-eun. Before each filming session, Shin underwent three hours of make-up that included attaching a silicone mask formed from a mold of her face. A fat suit and padded clothing were also used to create the appearance of a heavy 30-something.

Original soundtrack

Part 1

Part 2

Part 3

Part 4

Part 5

Part 6

Part 7

Part 8

Ratings
In this table,  represent the lowest ratings and  represent the highest ratings.

Awards and nominations

References

External links
  
 
 
 

Korean Broadcasting System television dramas
2015 South Korean television series debuts
2016 South Korean television series endings
South Korean romantic comedy television series
Television series by KBS Media